Wingspan: Hits and History is a greatest hits compilation album by English musician Paul McCartney, featuring material spanning his first solo album McCartney in 1970 to the 1984 Give My Regards to Broad Street movie soundtrack.

Wingspan is separated into two distinct sets: the "Hits" disc features commercially successful material, while "History" showcases lesser-known songs from the same period. American and British editions of the album vary slightly, as the UK edition contains the studio version of "Coming Up", while the US edition contains "Coming Up (Live at Glasgow)", which was more popular there. The Japanese version of the album also includes "Eat at Home", which had been issued as a single in Japan.

Release and reception

Released in 2001 in conjunction with a prime time TV documentary, similarly called Wingspan, the associated soundtrack was a commercial success. In the United States, it went straight to number 2 on the Billboard 200 with sales of 221,000 copies in the first week of its release. The album charted there for 14 weeks, selling approximately 970,000 units as of 2005. Wingspan has been certified double platinum by the Recording Industry Association of America, and also reached gold status in the UK, Australia and New Zealand. A DVD release of the broadcast documentary – which dealt with McCartney's relationship with Linda Eastman and their eventual marriage, the traumatic final year of the Beatles' career and his own role in their break-up, and the story of Wings' formation and career through the 1970s towards their dissolution in 1980 – was produced by Mary McCartney, who also interviewed her father in the film.

Track listing

Disc one: Hits

Disc two: History

Notes:

The U.S. version of the album substitutes the studio version of "Coming Up" with the live version appearing on the single's B-side.
The Japanese version of the album includes "Eat at Home" as the last track on disc one.

Charts and certifications

Weekly charts

Year-end charts

Certifications and sales

See also
 Wings Greatest

References

Paul McCartney and Wings compilation albums
2001 greatest hits albums
Albums produced by Paul McCartney
Albums produced by George Martin
Albums produced by Linda McCartney
Albums produced by Chris Thomas (record producer)
Paul McCartney compilation albums
Parlophone compilation albums